Rhodopteriana is a genus of moths in the family Eupterotidae. The genus was described by Thierry Bouyer in 2011.

Species
Rhodopteriana abyssinica (Rothschild, 1917)
Rhodopteriana anaemica (Hampson, 1910)
Rhodopteriana distincta (Rothschild, 1917)
Rhodopteriana funebris (Gaede, 1927)
Rhodopteriana geita Darge, 2013
Rhodopteriana gishwatiana Darge, 2013
Rhodopteriana insignifica (Rothschild, 1917)
Rhodopteriana iyayiana Darge, 2013
Rhodopteriana kataviana Darge, 2013
Rhodopteriana nakitomana Darge, 2013
Rhodopteriana obscura (Aurivillius, 1893)
Rhodopteriana rhodoptera (Gerstaecker, 1871)
Rhodopteriana roseobrunnea (Rothschild, 1917)
Rhodopteriana rungwana Darge, 2013
Rhodopteriana salaamensis Darge, 2013
Rhodopteriana sidamoensis Darge, 2013
Rhodopteriana soricis (Rothschild, 1917)
Rhodopteriana ulembwana Darge, 2013

References
 

 , 2011: Démembrement et réorganisation des genres Jana Herrich-Schäffer, 1854 et Hoplojana Aurivillius, 1901 (Lepidoptera: Eupterotidae). Lambillionea 111 (3) Tomé 1: 211-218.
  2013c: Nouvelles especes de Rhodopteriana Bouyer, 2012. (Lepidoptera, Eupterotidae). Saturnafrica, 15: 35-42.

Janinae